Santa Maria Independent School District is a public school district based in the community of Santa Maria, Texas, United States.

In addition to Santa Maria, the district serves the communities of Bluetown and Iglesia Antigua.

Santa Maria ISD has three campuses - Santa Maria High School (grades 9-12), Santa Maria Middle (grades 5-8), and Tony Gonzalez Elementary (prekindergarten - grade 4).

As of 2007, the Texas State Energy Conservation Office awards Santa Maria ISD money due to the colonias served by the district.

In 2009, the school district was rated "academically acceptable" by the Texas Education Agency.

References

External links
 

School districts in Cameron County, Texas